Carl Henrik Monssen (13 July 1921 – 25 February 1992) was a Norwegian competition rower and Olympic medalist. He received a bronze medal in the coxed eight event at the 1948 Summer Olympics, as a member of the Norwegian team.

Monssen received a bronze and a silver medal in the coxless four events at the 1949 and 1953 European Championships, respectively.

References

1921 births
1992 deaths
Norwegian male rowers
Olympic rowers of Norway
Rowers at the 1948 Summer Olympics
Olympic bronze medalists for Norway
Olympic medalists in rowing
Medalists at the 1948 Summer Olympics
European Rowing Championships medalists